Love at Sea may refer to:

 Love at Sea (1936 film), a British comedy film directed by Adrian Brunel
 Love at Sea (1964 film), a French film directed by Guy Gilles

British and Dominions Studios films